In chemistry, a plumbate often refers to compounds that can be viewed as derivatives of the hypothetical  anion. The term also refers to any anion of lead or any salt thereof. So the term is vague and somewhat archaic.

Examples

Halides
Lead perovskite semiconductors are often described as plumbates.

Lead oxyanions
Plumbates are formed by the reaction of lead(IV) oxide, with alkali. For example, dissolving  in a hot, concentrated aqueous solution of potassium hydroxide forms the potassium hexahydroxoplumbate(IV) salt .

The most widely discussed plumbates are derivatives of barium plumbate . When doped with some bismuth in place of lead, the material  exhibits superconductivity at 13 K. At the time of this discovery, oxides did not show such properties. The surprise associated with this work was eclipsed by the advent of the cuprate superconductors.

Binary lead oxides
Lead tetroxide ("red lead"), a mixed oxide with formula , may be thought of as lead(II) ortho-plumbate(IV), . Lead sesquioxide, is also known, and has the structure lead(II) meta-plumbate(IV), .

References

External links
National Pollutant Inventory - Lead and Lead Compounds Fact Sheet

Lead(IV) compounds
Salts
Oxyanions
Oxometallates